Palumbina guerinii is a moth of the family Gelechiidae. It is found in southern Europe, from the Iberian Peninsula north to France, east to Italy and Greece.

The wingspan is about 11 mm. The forewings are pale olive grey, a little darker posteriorly. Before the middle is an oblique whitish fascia, nearest the base of the wing on the inner margin, the whitish colour of this fascia runs along the edge of the costa and inner margin to the middle of the wing. Beyond the middle is a whitish blotch not reaching to the costa, and intersected by two dark olive-grey veins. The apex of the wing is whitish, streaked with grey. The hindwings are pale grey.

It is considered a pest on pistachio trees.

References

Palumbina
Moths of Europe
Insects of Turkey
Moths described in 1858